This is a list of musicians notable for playing the hurdy-gurdy.

List 

 Alestorm
 Andy Irvine
 Anna Katharina Kränzlein
 Anna Murphy
 Anton Newcombe
 Bear McCreary
 Ben Grossman
 Blowzabella
 Candice Night
 Cellar Darling
 Dominique Regef
 Dorothy Carter
 Eluveitie
 Emmanuelle Parrenin
 Faun
 Gaia Consort
 Geologist
 Ithilien
 In Extremo
 Jean-François Dutertre
 Jem Finer
 Jimmy Page
 Jonne Järvelä
 Keiji Haino
 The Kelly Family
 Leo Abrahams
 Mykola Budnyk
 Nigel Eaton
 Patty Gurdy
 Régine Chassagne
 Rémy Couvez
 Sergio Berardo
 Ritchie Blackmore
 Saltatio Mortis
 Sébastien Tron 
 Stam1na
 Stevie Wishart
 Storm Seeker
 Subway to Sally
 Valentin Clastrier

References 

Hurdy-gurdy
Hurdy-gurdy players